The Irish Masters was a professional snooker tournament. It was founded in 1978, following on from the successful Benson & Hedges Ireland Tournament (alternatively known as the Benson & Hedges Ireland Championship). The final champion of the tournament was Ronnie O'Sullivan.

History

Early events
The event started out in 1975 as the Benson & Hedges Challenge Match between Alex Higgins and John Spencer. The match initially carried a £250 prize for the winner and £150 for the runner-up, but both players agreed to a "winner-takes-all" format. Spencer scored two centuries (a 121 and a 109) and despite Higgins leading 7–5, Spencer won four frames in a row to win. In 1976 and 1977 it was expanded to a four-man invitational event, called the Benson & Hedges Ireland Tournament.

Irish Masters
In 1978 the tournament was renamed the Irish Masters and continued as an ever-present fixture on the snooker calendar until 2005. Benson & Hedges continued their sponsorship with the tournament being played at Goffs, Co. Kildare. After tobacco sponsorship was outlawed in the Republic of Ireland in 2000, the Irish government funded the event from 2001 and it was subsequently relocated to the Citywest Hotel, Saggart, Co. Dublin. The tournament was staged on an invitational basis for most of its existence but became a ranking tournament from the 2002/03 season. The event was dropped from the calendar in the 2005/2006 season. In 2007, a three-day invitational event known as the Kilkenny Irish Masters was staged with 16 players. It attracted a strong field with 9 of the world's top 16 players taking part, with Ronnie O'Sullivan winning the title.

The tournament was dominated most of all by Steve Davis, who won it eight times. It was won by Irish players on two occasions, Alex Higgins in 1989 and Ken Doherty in 1998. Doherty claimed the title despite losing in the final 3–9 against Ronnie O'Sullivan, as O'Sullivan subsequently failed a drugs test after testing positive for cannabis. There was only one official maximum break in the history of the tournament. John Higgins made it in the quarter-finals of the 2000 event against Jimmy White. There has been one further maximum break in 2007 by O'Sullivan, but it is not included in the list of official maximum breaks, as the table was not to the required standards used on the professional circuit.

Winners

See also
Irish Open
Irish Professional Championship
2011 Alex Higgins International Trophy

Notes 

.O'Sullivan failed a drugs test after testing positive for cannabis. Doherty was awarded the title.

References

 
Recurring sporting events established in 1975
Recurring events disestablished in 2007
1975 establishments in Ireland
2007 disestablishments in Ireland
Defunct snooker competitions
Snooker non-ranking competitions
Sport in County Dublin
Sport in County Kildare
Snooker competitions in Ireland